Henry Joyce, Mayor of Galway, 1542–1543.

Joyce was a member of one of The Tribes of Galway, and the only member of the Joyce family to become Mayor. Other members of the family included Archbishop William Joyce of Tuam (appointed 1486) and William Joyce, bailiff of Galway in 1507. William Henry notes that he was active as an arbitrator in several legal disputes in the town over the course of his life

See also
 Tribes of Galway
 Galway
 Richard Joyce

References
 History of Galway, James Hardiman, Galway, 1820.
 Old Galway, Maureen Donovan O'Sullivan, 1942.
 Henry, William (2002). Role of Honour: The Mayors of Galway City 1485–2001. Galway: Galway City Council.  
 Martyn, Adrian, The Tribes of Galway:1124–1642, Galway, 2016. 

Mayors of Galway
Politicians from County Galway
Year of birth missing
Year of death missing